Ramakrishna Mission Residential College (Autonomous), Narendrapur is an institute for pursuing undergraduate and postgraduate studies in the Indian state of West Bengal. It is an autonomous college located in Narendrapur, Kolkata. The college was established in 1960 and is affiliated to the University of Calcutta. It is run by the Ramakrishna Mission Ashrama, Narendrapur. It is a residential boys-only college. The college has received the nineteenth (19th) rank nationally (4th in West Bengal) among colleges in National Institute Ranking Framework (NIRF), 2022.

History
The history of Ramakrishna Mission Residential College is similar to that of its parent organization, Ramakrishna Mission Ashrama, Narendrapur. In 1943, in the wake of the disastrous Bengal Famine, a handful of spirited and dedicated monks of the Ramakrishna Order set up a students’ home at Pathuriaghata in North Kolkata.

The home was housed on a small plot of land earmarked for the education of young college and university students. It slowly but steadily accumulated a reputation for nurturing meritorious but indigent students. In 1957, the home was relocated to a larger compound at Narendrapur. Within a short span of time it acquired an enviable stature under the dynamic leadership and persistent efforts of the late Swami Lokeswarananda, the founder-secretary, and his team of teachers. The acorn has now grown into a massive oak. The campus of the Ashrama is spread over 150 acres of land, dotted with flower gardens, orchards, mango groves and water bodies. Far away from the squalor and clutter of the city, the Ashrama boasts quite a few centres of excellence, Ramakrishna Mission Residential College (Autonomous) being amongst them.

The college was established on the Ashrama campus in July 1960. Affiliated to the University of Calcutta, its first batch of students commenced classes in August 1960. Much later in 1976, the Higher Secondary Unit of West Bengal Council of Higher Secondary Education started functioning on the college premises, but was shifted to the Vidyalaya after 2006. Autonomous status was conferred upon the college in 2008. Fully residential, this boys' college follows the same principles and objectives as all other institutions functioning under the aegis of the Ramakrishna Mission.

Academics
Three-year semester system undergraduate degree courses under the Choice Based Credit System (CBCS) in the following core (honours) subjects: 

(i) chemistry, (ii) computer science, (iii) physics, (iv) mathematics, (v) statistics, (vi) economics, (vii) english, (viii) bengali, (ix) sanskrit, (x) history, (xi) political science, (xii) philosophy .

Two-year semester system post-graduate courses in chemistry, computer science, physics and english .

Ramakrishna Mission Residential College (Autonomous), Narendrapur is also a recognised research centre under the University of Calcutta (vide Syndicate Resolution No. Permission/690/UCAC/C.U. dt. 14.05.2015). 

The University of Calcutta has granted Ramakrishna Mission Residential College (Autonomous), Narendrapur the permission to start Vivekananda Centre for Research to conduct M. Phil./Ph.D. courses from the academic session 2015–16 (vide letter No. Permission/690/UCAC/C.U. dt. 14.05.2015). The institution has the requisite infrastructure to conduct post-doctoral research work too. 

Moreover, it has been also conducting regular Ph.D. courses in physics, chemistry and mathematics.

Rankings

Ramakrishna Mission Residential College has ranked 19th among colleges in India by the National Institutional Ranking Framework (NIRF) in 2022.

Campus life
The campus of the college and ashrama occupies . The college provides several facilities for its students, such as hostels, library, multigym, swimming pool, games and sports and medical facilities. At present, there are four hostels under the supervision of the college:   

Brahmananda Bhavana: In the presence of Swami Lokeswaranandaji Maharaj (the founding monk of the Narendrapur Ashrama) and other dignitaries, Sri Morarji Desai, then-Finance Minister of India, inaugurated the building. The oldest of all the hostels at Narendrapur Ramakrishna Mission Ashrama opened on 5th December 1958. The bhavana celebrates the birth anniversary of Swami Brahmananda every year.  

Shree Gouranga Bhavana: East-facing hostel. The most unique feature of the bhavana is a centrally located open airspace. Shree Gouranga Bhavana Jayanti is celebrated during the Dol Purnima with flying colours under the full moon sky.  

Ramakrishnananda Bhavana: The bhavana is a three-storeyed building with an adjoining dining hall. The bhavana celebrates the birth anniversary of Swami Ramakrishnananda every year.  

Adbhutananda Bhavana: The bhavana is a three-storeyed building dedicated to the accommodation of the college students. The bhavana celebrates the birth anniversary of Swami Adbhutananda every year.  

The college also provides a library. The college building has four floors. A swimming pool beside the Brahmananda Bhavana was recently inaugurated.   

On 16 September 2018, Sarada Mandir, the college annexe was inaugurated by the president of Belur Math, Swami Smaranananda.

Gallery

See also 
List of colleges affiliated to the University of Calcutta
Education in India
Education in West Bengal

References

External links
 Official website

Hinduism in Kolkata
Men's universities and colleges
University of Calcutta affiliates
Universities and colleges affiliated with the Ramakrishna Mission
Educational institutions established in 1960
1960 establishments in West Bengal